WAXB (850 AM), is a radio station licensed to Ridgefield, Connecticut, United States, one of three area stations owned by The Berkshire Broadcasting Corporation. The others are News/Talk 800 AM WLAD and Hot Adult Contemporary 98Q/98.3 FM WDAQ. WAXB airs a Spanish adult hits radio format for the Greater Danbury region of Connecticut. The station uses the identification "Juan 850".  Because 850 AM is a clear channel frequency reserved for KOA in Denver, Colorado and KICY in Nome, Alaska, WAXB must sign-off at night to avoid interference with those stations.

History
The Federal Communications Commission assigned the call letters WREF to the frequency on January 18, 1984. WREF began broadcasting on March 15, 1985, nearly a decade after getting the original construction permit, programming an adult standards format from sign-on through its sale to Berkshire in 1996, when the new owners switched the format to oldies.

In late March 2004, WREF became the first station to air Scott Shannon's "True Oldies Channel." After a period of tweaking on WREF, Shannon put the format into nationwide radio syndication in July 2004.

On February 1, 2011, WREF rebranded as "B107.3," adopted the call letters WAXB and began a simulcast of the 850 AM signal on FM translator W297AN (107.3 FM licensed to Danbury). The WAXB calls had previously been in the market at 105.5 FM before Cumulus Media abandoned the oldies format on that frequency in 2002 (which is now WDBY, a country music station). B107.3 switched to a locally programmed Classic Hits format, featuring pop and rock hits of the 1970s and 1980s  on January 31, 2013.

On July 1, 2016, WAXB rebranded as "B94.5", switching translators to W233CF 94.5 FM Danbury.

On February 26, 2020, at 3 p.m., WAXB changed their format from classic hits to classic rock, branded as "94.5 The Hawk".

On December 17, 2020, WAXB changed format to Spanish Adult Hits "Juan 850." "94.5 The Hawk" moved to WDAQ-HD4 and continued to be relayed by W233CF.

References

1992 Broadcasting Yearbook, page A-63
http://meduci.com/stations.html

External links
WAXB official website

FCC History Cards for WAXB

AXB
Radio stations established in 1985
AXB
1985 establishments in Connecticut
AXB